The Adal Sultanate, or the Adal Empire or the ʿAdal   or the Bar Saʿad dīn (alt. spelling Adel Sultanate, Adal Sultanate) was a medieval Sunni Muslim Empire which was located in the Horn of Africa. It was founded by Sabr ad-Din II after the fall of the Sultanate of Ifat. The kingdom flourished circa 1415 to 1577. The sultanate and state were established by the local inhabitants of Zeila. or the Harar plateau. At its height, the polity under Sultan Badlay controlled the territory stretching from Somaliland to the port city of Suakin in Sudan. The Adal Empire maintained a robust commercial and political relationship with the Ottoman Empire.

Etymology
Adal is believed to be an abbreviation of Havilah.

Eidal or Aw Abdal, was the Emir of Harar in the eleventh century which the lowlands outside the city of Harar is named.  In the thirteenth century, the Arab writer al-Dimashqi refers to the Adal Sultanate's capital, Zeila, by its Somali name "Awdal". The modern Awdal region of Somaliland, which was part of the Adal Sultanate, bears the kingdom's name.

Locally the empire was known to the Muslims as Bar Sa'ad ad-din meaning "The country of Sa'ad ad-din"

History

Sultanate established
Ethiopian historian Taddesse Tamrat states Adal's central authority in the fourteenth century consisted of the Argobba, Harari and Silt'e people. According to Patrick Gikes, Adal in the sixteenth century designated the ancient Harla and Somali people. Marriage alliances between Argobba, Harari and Somali people were also common within the Adal Sultanate.

Kingdom established
Adal Kingdom (also Awdal, Adl, or Adel) was centred around Zeila, its capital.  It was established by the local Somali tribes in the early ninth century.  Zeila attracted merchants from around the world, contributing to the wealth of the city.  Zeila is an ancient city and it was one of the earliest cities in the world to embrace Islam.

In the late ninth century, Al-Yaqubi, an Armenian Muslim scholar and traveller, wrote that the Kingdom of Adal was a small wealthy kingdom and that Zeila served as the headquarters for the kingdom, which dated back to the beginning of the century.

Islamic influence
Islam was introduced to the Horn region early on from the Arabian peninsula, shortly after the hijra. Zeila's two-mihrab Masjid al-Qiblatayn dates to about the seventh century, and is the oldest mosque in Africa.  In the late ninth century, Al-Yaqubi wrote that Muslims were living along the northern Somali seaboard.  The polity was governed by local Somali dynasties established by the Adelites.  Adal's history from this founding period forth would be characterized by a succession of battles with neighbouring Abyssinia.

Yusuf bin Ahmad al-Kawneyn was born in Zeila during the Adal Kingdom period.  Al-Kawneyn is a Somali Muslim saint. He is believed to be the ancestor of the royal family known as the Walashma dynasty, which later governed both the Ifat Sultanate and the Adal Sultanate during the Middle Ages.

Rise of the sultanate

Sultan Haqq ad-Din II abandoned the former Walasma base for Harar leading to Adal becoming a major threat to Abyssinia surpassing even its predecessor Ifat in this regard. Adal is mentioned by name in the 14th century in the context of the battles between the Muslims of the Somali and Afar seaboard and the Abyssinian King Amda Seyon I's Christian troops.

In 1332, the King of Adal was slain in a military campaign aimed at halting Amda Seyon's march toward Zeila. When the last Sultan of Ifat, Sa'ad ad-Din II, was killed by Dawit I of Ethiopia at the port city of Zeila in 1410, his children escaped to Yemen, before later returning in 1415. In the early 15th century, Adal's capital was moved further inland to the town of Dakkar, where Sabr ad-Din II, the eldest son of Sa'ad ad-Din II, established a new Adal administration after his return from Yemen. The Emperor of Ethiopia Tewodros I was soon killed by the Adal Sultanate upon the return of Sa'ad ad-Din's heirs to the Horn of Africa. During this period, Adal emerged as a centre of Muslim resistance against the expanding Christian Abyssinian kingdom. Adal would thereafter govern all of the territory formerly ruled by the Ifat Sultanate, as well as the land further east all the way to Cape Guardafui, according to Leo Africanus.

After 1468, a new breed of rulers emerged on the Adal political scene. The dissidents opposed Walashma rule owing to a treaty that Sultan Muhammad ibn Badlay had signed with Emperor Baeda Maryam of Ethiopia, wherein Badlay agreed to submit yearly tribute. This was done to achieve peace in the region, though tribute was never sent. Adal's Emirs, who administered the provinces, interpreted the agreement as a betrayal of their independence and a retreat from the polity's long-standing policy of resistance to Abyssinian incursions. The main leader of this opposition was the Emir of Zeila, the Sultanate's richest province. As such, he was expected to pay the highest share of the annual tribute to be given to the Abyssinian Emperor. Emir Laday Usman subsequently marched to Dakkar and seized power in 1471. However, Usman did not dismiss the Sultan from office, but instead gave him a ceremonial position while retaining the real power for himself. Adal now came under the leadership of a powerful Emir who governed from the palace of a nominal Sultan. Mohammad Hassan states Adal Sultans began losing control of the state to Harar's aristocracy, the Harari and Harla people.

Adalite armies under the leadership of rulers such as Sabr ad-Din II, Mansur ad-Din, Jamal ad-Din II, Shams ad-Din and Emir Mahfuz subsequently continued the struggle against Abyssinian expansionism.

Emir Mahfuz, who would fight with successive emperors, caused the death of Emperor Na'od and Eskender, but he was in turn killed by the forces of Emperor Dawit II (Lebna Dengel) in 1517. After the death of Mahfuz, a civil war started for the office of Highest Emir of Adal. Five Emirs came to power in only two years. But at last, a matured and powerful leader called Garad Abuun Addus (Garad Abogne) assumed power. When Garad Abogne was in power he was defeated and killed by Sultan Abu Bakr ibn Muhammad, and In 1554, under his initiative, Harar became the capital of Adal. This time not only the young Emirs revolted, but the whole country of Adal rose against Sultan Abu Bakr, because Garad Abogne was loved by the people of the sultanate. Many people went to join the force of a young imam called Ahmad ibn Ibrahim al-Ghazi, who claimed revenge for Garad Abogne. Al-Ghazi assumed power in Adal in 1527, however he did not remove the Sultan, but instead left him in his nominal office. Yet, when Abu Bakr waged war on him, Ahmad ibn Ibrahim killed Abu Bakr, and replaced him with Abu Bakr's younger brother Umar Din. They fought under a combination of three banners used by Ahmad al-Ghazi

In the 16th century, Adal organised an effective army led by Imam Ahmad ibn Ibrahim al-Ghazi that invaded the Abyssinian empire. This campaign is historically known as the Conquest of Abyssinia or Futuh al Habash. During the war, Ahmed pioneered the use of cannons supplied by the Ottoman Empire, which were deployed against Solomonic forces and their Portuguese allies led by Cristóvão da Gama. Some scholars argue that this conflict proved, through their use on both sides, the value of firearms such as the matchlock musket, cannons and the arquebus over traditional weapons.

Ethnicity

The Walashma dynasty of the Ifat and Adal sultanates possessed Somali genealogical traditions.

During Adal's early period, when it was centred on the city of Zeila in the present-day northwestern Awdal region, the kingdom was primarily composed of Somalis, Afars, Hararis, and Arabs. Ethiopian historian Bahru Zewde and others however state the Walasma led sultanate primarily included the Ethiopian Semitic speaking Argobba and Harari people, it later expanded to comprise Afar and Somali peoples. Between the late 1400s to mid 1500s there was a large scale migration of Hadhrami people into Adal.

Among the earliest mentions of the Somali by name has come through a victory poem written by Emperor Yeshaq I of Abyssinia against the king of Adal, as the Simur are said to have submitted and paid tribute. As Taddesse Tamrat writes: "Dr Enrico Cerulli has shown that Simur was an old Harari name for the Somali, who are still known by them as Tumur. Hence, it is most probable that the mention of the Somali and the Simur in relation to Yishaq refers to the king's military campaigns against Adal, where the Somali seem to have constituted a major section of the population."

On his background:

According to Leo Africanus (1526) and George Sale (1760), the Adelites were of a tawny brown or olive complexion on the northern littoral, and grew swarthier towards the southern interior. They generally had long, lank hair. Most wore a cotton sarong but no headpiece or sandals, with many glass and amber trinkets around their necks, wrists, arms and ankles. The king and other aristocrats often donned instead a body-length garment topped with a headdress. All were Muslims. In the southern hinterland, the Adelites lived beside pagan "Negroes", with whom they bartered various commodities.

Languages
Various languages from the Afro-Asiatic family were spoken in the vast Adal Sultanate. Arabic served as a lingua franca, and was used by the ruling Walashma dynasty.  According to the 19th-century Ethiopian historian Asma Giyorgis suggests that the Walashma dynasty themselves spoke Arabic.

Economy

One of the empire's most wealthy provinces was Ifat it was well watered, by the large river Awash. Additionally, besides the surviving Awash River,  at least five other rivers in the area between Harar and Shawa plateau existed.  The general area was well cultivated, densely populated with numerous villages adjoining each other.  Agricultural produce included three main cereals, wheat, sorghum and teff, as well as beans, aubergines, melons, cucumbers, marrows, cauliflowers and mustard. Many different types of fruit were grown, among them bananas, lemons, limes, pomegranates, apricots, peaces, citrons mulberries and grapes. Other plants included sycamore tree, sugar cane, from which kandi, or sugar was extracted and inedible wild figs.

The province also grew the stimulant plant Khat. Which was exported to Yemen. Adal was abundant in large numbers of cattle, sheep, and some goats. There was also chickens. Both buffaloes and wild fowl were sometimes hunted. The province had a great reputation for producing butter and honey. .

Whereas provinces such as Bale, surrounding regions of Webi Shabelle was known for it cotton cultivation and an age old weaving industry. While the El Kere region produced salt which was an important trading item 

Zeila the headquarters of the Kingdom was a wealthy city and abundantly supplied with provisions. It possessed grain, meat, oil, honey and wax. Furthermore, the citizens had many horses and reared cattle of all kinds, as a result they had plenty of butter, milk and flesh, as well as a great store of millet, barley and fruits; all of which was exported to Aden. The port city was so well supplied with victuals that it exported it's surplus to Aden, Jeddah, Mecca and "All Arabia"" which then was dependent on the supplies/produce from the city which they favoured above all. Zeila was described as a "Port of much provisions for Aden, and all parts of Arabia and many countries and Kingdoms".

The Principal exports, according the Portuguese writer Corsali, were gold, ivory and slaves. A "great number" of the latter was captured from the Ethiopian Empire, then were exported through the port of Zeila to Persia, Arabia, Egypt and India.

As a result of this flourishing trade, the citizens of Zeila accordingly lived "extremely well" and the city was well built guarded by many soldiers on both foot and horses.

Historian Al-Umari in his study in 1340s about the history of Adal, the medieval state in western and northern parts of historical Somalia and some related areas, Al-Umari of Cairo states that in the land of Zayla’ (Awdal):

 “they cultivate two times annually by seasonal rains … The rainfall for the winter is called ‘Bil’ and rainfall for the ‘summer’ is called ‘Karam’ in the language of the people of Zayla.”

It appears that the historian was referring, in one-way or another, to these still used Somali terms, Karan and Bil. This indicates that the Somali solar calendar citizens of Zeila was using to farm with at that time was very similar to the one they use today and gives us further insight into the local farming practices during that period.

The kingdoms agricultural and other produce was not only abundant but also very cheap according to Maqrizi thirty pounds of meat sold for only half a dirhem, while for only four dirhems you could purchase a bunch of about 100 Damascus grapes.

Trade on the upland river valleys themselves connected with the coast to the interior markets. Created a lucrative caravan trade route between Ethiopian interior, the Hararghe highlands, Eastern Lowlands and the coastal cities such as Zeila and Berbera. The trade from the interior was also important for the reason that included gold from the Ethiopian territories in the west, including Damot and an unidentified district called Siham. The rare metal sold for 80 to 120 dirhems per ounce.   The whole empire and the wider region was interdependent on each other and formed a single economy and at the same time a cultural unit interconnected with several important trade routes upon which the economy and the welfare of the whole area depended 

During its existence, Adal had relations and engaged in trade with other polities in Northeast Africa, the Near East, Europe and South Asia. Many of the historic cities in the Horn of Africa such as Abasa, Amud, Awbare and Berbera flourished under its reign with courtyard houses, mosques, shrines, walled enclosures and cisterns. Adal attained its peak in the 14th century, trading in slaves, ivory and other commodities with Abyssinia and kingdoms in Arabia through its chief port of Zeila. The cities of the empire imported intricately coloured glass bracelets and Chinese celadon for palace and home decoration. Adal also used imported currency such as Egyptian dinars and dirhems.

According to Sada Mire, the flourishing medieval cities and towns in Adal Sultanate such as Zeila, Berbera, Abasa, Amud, Awbube, Awbare, Qoorgaab, Gogesa (near Gabiley), Aw-Barkhaadle (near Hargeisa) Fardowsa (near Sheikh), Maduna, Derbiga, Cad Cad and others were founded and developed by Somali pastoral and trading communities. While Somali locals state ancient towns were built by the Harla people.

Military

The Adalite military was divided into several sections such as the infantry consisting of swordsmen, archers and lancers that were commanded by various generals and lieutenants. These forces were complemented by a cavalry force and eventually, later in the empire's history, by matchlock-technology and cannons during the Conquest of Abyssinia. The various divisions were symbolised with a distinct flag.

Elite unit of military warriors in the Adal army was branded with the title Malassay or Malachai (Portuguese spelling). The term often became synonymous with Muslims in Ethiopia to outsiders, but contrary to popular beliefs it did not denote a tribe or clan. Reading the Futūḥ al-Ḥabaša, the Malasāy appear as the basic unit of the army of the imām. Unlike the other groups that make up this army, the Malasāy were a group social and not a tribe or a clan. Unlike the Balaw, Somali or Ḥarla, a man Malasāy is not born. He obtained this title after demonstrating his military capabilities. ‘Arab Faqīh gives a relatively precise definition of what he means by "malasāy:

  وفرقة الملساي اھل الغزو والجھاد ا c صلي المعتمد عليھم في القتال والصناديد ا c بطال فيھم ا c مام
And the Malasāy troop, who are people of raids and ğihād, worthy men
of confidence, who could be trusted during the fighting, of the army chiefs who not only do not flee from the battlefield but who protect the retreat of his family.

(بطال c ا والصناديد.)

The imām was with them. 

The Adal soldiers donned elaborate helmets and steel armour made up of chain-mail with overlapping tiers. The Horsemen of Adal wore protective helmets that covered the entire face except for the eyes, and breastplates on their body, while they harnessed their horses in a similar fashion. In siege warfare, ladders were employed to scale buildings and other high positions such as hills and mountains.

M. Hassan states:

M. Lewis writes:

Ethnic Somalis are stated to be the majority of the army according to the Oxford History of Islam:

According to Merid Wolde Aregay:

Abyssinian–Adal conflict

The Ethiopian–Adal war was a military conflict between the Ethiopian Empire (Abyssinia) and the Adal Sultanate that took place from 1529 until 1543. Abyssinian troops consisted of Maya, Amhara, Tigrayan and Agaw ethnic groups. Adal forces consisted mostly of Afar, Somali, Harla, Argobba, and Arab formations, supported by the Ottomans.

In the mid-1520s, Imam Ahmad ibn Ibrahim al-Ghazi assumed control of Adal and launched a war against Abyssinia, which was then under the leadership of Dawit II (Lebna Dengel). Supplied by the Ottoman Empire with firearms, Ahmad was able to defeat the Abyssinians at the Battle of Shimbra Kure in 1529 and seize control of the wealthy Ethiopian highlands, though the Abyssinians continued to resist from the highlands. In 1541, the Portuguese, who had vested interests in the Indian Ocean, eventually sent aid to the Abyssinians in the form of 400 musketeers. Adal, in response, received 900 from the Ottomans.

Imam Ahmad was initially successful against the Abyssinians while campaigning in the Autumn of 1542, killing the Portuguese commander Cristóvão da Gama in August that year. However, Portuguese musketry proved decisive in Adal's defeat at the Battle of Wayna Daga, near Lake Tana, in February 1543, where Ahmad was killed in battle. The Abyssinians subsequently retook the Amhara plateau and recouped their losses against Adal. The Ottomans, who had their own troubles to deal with in the Mediterranean, were unable to help Ahmad's successors. When Adal collapsed in 1577, the seat of the Sultanate shifted from Harar to Aussa in the desert region of Afar and a new sultanate began.

Collapse of the sultanate
 
After the death of Imam Ahmad, the Adal Sultanate lost most of its territory in Abyssinian lands. In 1550 Nur ibn Mujahid assumed power after he killed Abyssinian emperor Gelawdewos.  Due to constant Oromo raids both Adal and Abyssinian rulers struggled to consolidate power outside of their realms. The Adal Sultanate subsequently ended due to infighting with tribes. The Adal Sultanate was weakened after the death of Emir Nur due to the Oromo raids in 1577 and its headquarter were relocated to the oasis of Aussa in the Danakil desert under the leadership of Mohammed Jasa. The Imamate of Aussa declined gradually in the next century and was destroyed by internal rebellions led by Afar and their Harla allies in 1672. Enrico Cerulli states, eventually Zeila and Harar broke free from Aussa as it deteriorated, the semitic Adal nobility now viewed the state as nothing more than a savage Afar domain that pillaged caravans.

Oromo expansion

After the conflict between Adal and Abyssinia had subsided, the conquest of the highland regions of Abyssinia and Adal by the Oromo (namely, through military expansion and the installation of the Gadaa socio-political system) ended in the contraction of both powers and changed regional dynamics for centuries to come. In essence, what had happened is that the populations of the highlands had not ceased to exist as a result of the Gadaa expansion, but were simply incorporated into a different socio-political system.

Legacy

The Adal Sultanate left behind many structures and artefacts from its heyday. Numerous such historical edifices and items are found in the northwestern Awdal province of Somaliland, as well as other parts of the Horn region where the polity held sway.

Archaeological excavations in the late 19th century and early 20th century at over fourteen sites in the vicinity of Borama in modern-day northwestern Somaliland unearthed, among other artefacts, silver coins identified as having been derived from Qaitbay (1468–89), the eighteenth Burji Mamluk Sultan of Egypt. Most of these finds are associated with the medieval Adal Sultanate. They were sent to the British Museum for preservation shortly after their discovery.

In 1950, the British Somaliland protectorate government commissioned an archaeological survey in twelve desert towns in present-day Republic of Somaliland, near the border with Ethiopia. According to the expedition team, the sites yielded the most salient evidence of late medieval period affluence. They contained ruins of what were evidently once large cities belonging to the Adal Sultanate. Towns such as Awbare, Awbube, Amud, Abasa and Gogesa, featured between 200 and 300 stone houses. The walls of certain sites still reportedly stood 18 meters high. Excavations in the area yielded 26 silver coins, unlike the copper pieces that were more common in polities below the Horn region. The earliest of these recovered coins had been minted by Sultan Barquq (1382–99), also of the Egyptian Burji dynasty, and the latest were again Sultan Qaitbay issues. All of the pieces had been struck in either Cairo or Damascus. A few gold coins were also discovered during the expedition, making the area the only place in the wider region to yield such pieces. Besides coinage, high quality porcelain was recovered from the Adal sites. The fine celadon ware was found either lying on the surface, or buried at a depth of seven and a half inches, or ensconced within dense middens four to five feet high. Among the artefacts were grey granular sherds with a cracked blue-green or sea-green glaze, and white crystalline fragments with an uncracked green-white glaze. Some Ming dynasty ware was also discovered, including many early Ming blue-and-white bowl sherds. They were adorned with tendril scrolls on a bluish ground and ornamented with black spotting, while other bowls had floral patterns outlined by grey or black-blue designs. Additionally, a few Ming red-and-white sherds were found, as well as white porcelain fragments with bluish highlights. The Adal sites appeared to reach an Indian Ocean terminus at the Sa'ad ad-Din Islands, named for Sultan Sa'ad ad-Din II of the Ifat Sultanate.

Additionally, local tradition identifies the archaeological site of Tiya in central Ethiopia as Yegragn Dingay ("Gran's stone") in reference to Imam Al-Ghazi. According to Joussaume (1995), who led archaeological work there, the site is relatively recent. It has been dated to between the 11th and 13th centuries CE. Tiya contains a number of megalithic pillars, including anthropomorphic and non-anthropomorphic/non-phallic stelae. Flat in form, these structures are characterized by distinctive, elaborate decorations, among which are swords, a standing human figure with arms akimbo, and plant-like symbols.

Sultans of Adal

See also
 List of Sunni Muslim dynasties
Isaaq Sultanate

Notes

Works cited

 
Former sultanates in the medieval Horn of Africa
History of Djibouti
History of Eritrea
15th century in Ethiopia
16th century in Ethiopia
900 establishments
1559 disestablishments in Africa
9th-century establishments in Africa